Canal+ 2 (Spanish: Canal+ Two) was a Spanish television channel in operated by Telefonica. It was available through the satellite platform Canal+. It was available through Digital terrestrial television from 2010 to 2011.

References

External links
 www.plus.es

Defunct television channels in Spain
Television channels and stations established in 2010
Spanish-language television stations
PRISA TV
Canal+ (Spanish TV provider)